Ben Jeffries (born 4 September 1980) is an Australian rugby league coach and former professional player who is the head coach of the North Queensland Cowboys NRL Women's Premiership team, the PNG Orchids and the Indigenous Women's All Stars.

Playing career

Early years
Born in Forster, Jeffries grew up in Forster and attended Forster High School, where he represented the Australian Schoolboys in 1998 and was signed by the Newcastle Knights.

St George Illawarra Dragons
In 2000, after two seasons in the Knights' lower grades, Jeffries joined the St George Illawarra Dragons. In Round 4 of the 2001 NRL season, he made his NRL debut in the Dragons 34–6 loss to the New Zealand Warriors, his only appearance for the club.

Wests Tigers
In 2001, Jeffries joined the Wests Tigers halfway through the season, playing nine games. In 2002, he played 18 games for the side, starting 16 at halfback.

Wakefield Trinity
In 2003, Jeffries joined Super League side Wakefield Trinity, playing 27 games in his first season at the club. In 2004, he played 33 games, scoring 24 tries and leading Wakefield to the finals. In 2005, he despite Wakefield's 10th-place finish, Jeffries scored 20 tries in 27 games, finishing as the club's top try scorer. Following his successful 2005 season, he signed a new three-year deal with the club. In 2007, after 143 games for the club, Jeffries joined the Bradford Bulls.

Bradford Bulls
In 2007, Jeffries played 27 games for the Bradford Bulls as they qualified for the finals series. On 11 September 2009, after two seasons with Bradford, he signed a three-year deal to return to Wakefield.

Wakefield Trinity (second stint)
In 2010, Jeffries played 22 games in his return season for Wakefield. On 7 May 2011, after playing five games for the Wakefield, Jeffries re-joined Bradford on an 18-month contract.

Bradford Bulls (second stint)
Jeffries appeared in every game for the rest of the 2011 season after returning to Bradford, starting at five-eighth from Round 14 to Round 27. In 2012, he featured in five consecutive games from Round 4 to Round 8. He missed Round 9 due to injury but returned a week later to play in nine consecutive games from Round 10 to Round 18. He also played in Round 20 and then from Round 23 to Round 26.

On 5 September 2012, he announced his departure from the Bradford Bulls to return to Australia to play part-time for the Kurri Kurri Bulldogs. At the time, Jeffries was the only Australian to play 10 consecutive years in the Super League.

Coaching career
In 2014, Jeffries worked as an assistant coach for the Newcastle Knights SG Ball Cup side. Later that year, he joined the Northern Pride Queensland Cup side, playing one game, and working as the strength & conditioning and hookers & halves coach for their Cyril Connell Cup and Mal Meninga Cup sides. In 2015, he left the club after playing three trial games, being granted a release.

In 2015, Jeffries began working for the NRL as a Development Manager in Townsville. In 2016, he coached the Townsville women's team and the NQ Marlins under-14 girls side. On 19 October 2016, he became head coach of the Queensland Murri women's team.

In 2017, he joined the North Queensland Cowboys as an assistant coach their under-20 side under head coach Aaron Payne. Later that year, he was an assistant coach for the Queensland women's team.

In 2018, he was the assistant coach for the Townsville Blackhawks and head coach for the QAS women's under-18 squad.

On 20 December 2018, Jeffries was announced as the North Queensland Cowboys Elite Pathways coach, taking over from Aaron Payne.

In 2020, Jeffries coached the Indigenous Women's All Stars. He was again named head coach of the side for 2022 and 2023. In 2022, he coached the PNG Orchids at the 2021 Rugby League World Cup.

On 24 November 2022, he was announced as the North Queensland Cowboys inaugural NRLW head coach.

Statistics
 Statistics are correct to the end of the 2012 season

NRL

Super League

References

1980 births
Living people
Australian rugby league coaches
Australian rugby league players
Australian expatriate sportspeople in England
Bradford Bulls players
Indigenous Australian rugby league players
Kurri Kurri Bulldogs players
Rugby league five-eighths
Rugby league fullbacks
Rugby league halfbacks
Rugby league players from New South Wales
St. George Illawarra Dragons players
Wakefield Trinity players
Wests Tigers players